Eva Collins was an English snooker and billiards player. She was runner-up in the 1930 British Women's Billiards Championship, and in its successor tournament, the Women's Professional Billiards Championship in 1931.

Early life and billiards career
Eva Collins was the daughter of professional billiards player George Collins, who was the all-England billiards champion in 1877 and 1888. Her sister, Ella Collins, was also a pioneering women's billiards player.

She started learning to play in July 1902, and a few months later, at the age of 12, was the subject of an article in the Portsmouth Evening News for beating a boy of 16 in a billiards match.

In 1906, Collins played two series of billiards exhibition matches against "Madame Strebor," a pseudonym used by an unknown woman player who had toured with John Roberts Jr. The series held at Burroughes Hall finished 7–5 in favour of Madame Strebor. Shortly afterward, Collins won 15 of 24 matches against Strebor in Manchester.

Collins became a billiards instructor at the Lyceum Ladies Club. As of January 1936, she had been coaching for over 24 years. She used her father's cue in competition.

Women's Billiards Association and Women's Professional Billiards Championship

In 1930, Collins was the losing finalist in the British Women's Billiards Championship organised by the cue sports company Burrouhges and Watts.

When the Women's Billiards Association was formed in 1931, Collins was one of four professional players appointed to a committee to organise the professional championships, along with Joyce Gardner, Ruth Harrison, and Margaret Lennan.

From 1931, the Women's Billiards Association organised the world championship, with the same trophy used in the 1930 British Women's Billiards Championship, and Collins was again a losing finalist in the first competition under the Association's control, in 1931.

Collins played in the Women's Professional Billiards Championship each year from 1930 to 1937, but did not play in 1938, possibly due to her other commitments as a coach and referee.

She also competed in the Women's Professional Snooker Championship, but never reached the final of that tournament.

Refereeing
She was the first woman to qualify as a billiards and snooker referee, at a time when only around 200 men held the same qualification. At the Boy's Billiards Championship in 1932, became the first woman to referee a championship match.

Titles and achievements

Snooker

Billiards

References

External links
Miss Eva Collins plays Mr Frank Smith in a Billiard Match in aid of comfort for mine sweepers, 16 February 1918
Potting The Ball. Eva Collins teaching women to play at her Kensington billiards school, London, 2 November 1937.
Eva Collins in 1939.

English snooker players
Female snooker players
Female players of English billiards
English players of English billiards
Date of birth missing
Date of death missing
Sportspeople from Portsmouth